Emerson Ricardo Alcântara  (born 27 August 1970 in Cândido Mota) is a Brazilian football manager and a former defender and defensive midfielder for C.F. Os Belenenses. He is the former manager of North East Stars of Trinidad and Tobago.

Football Club Career

Emerson Alcântara started his career in 1991 with Esporte Clube Paraguaçuense in São Paulo before moving the year after to play for Brazilian second division side Criciúma Esporte Clube, who had the previous year won the Copa Do Brasil.

He then ended his playing career with one of Portugal’s oldest club C.F. Os Belenenses in 1996.

Coaching career
Emerson Alcântara began his coaching career in 2005 with a small club, Ipanema Atlético Clube, which is based in the Alagoas state before moving to XV de Piracicaba, a club playing in the São Paulo state championship. In 2009, they finished fourth in the regional league.

Prior to his arrival to take up the coaching position in Timor Leste, Emerson Alcântara had coached North East Stars in Trinidad and Tobago.
Emerson Alcântara joined Lonestar Kashmir F.C. as a manager on 2018.

References

External links

https://web.archive.org/web/20120929042739/http://www.affsuzukicup.com/news/emerson-to-lead-timor-leste-s-campaign-in-yangon

1970 births
Living people
Brazilian footballers
TT Pro League managers
Expatriate football managers in East Timor
Timor-Leste national football team managers
Association football defenders
North East Stars F.C. managers
Brazilian football managers
Burgan SC managers
Expatriate football managers in Kuwait
Brazilian expatriate sportspeople in Kuwait
Brazilian expatriate sportspeople in East Timor
Brazilian expatriate sportspeople in Portugal
Expatriate footballers in Portugal
RoundGlass Punjab FC managers
Expatriate football managers in India
Brazilian expatriate football managers
Brazilian expatriate sportspeople in India
Brazilian expatriate sportspeople in Myanmar
Expatriate football managers in Myanmar
Esporte Clube XV de Novembro (Piracicaba) managers